Ronnie Green may refer to:
 Ronnie Green (kickboxer), British kickboxer
 Ronnie D. Green, chancellor of the University of Nebraska–Lincoln

See also
 Ronald Green (disambiguation)